WMCX (88.9 FM, The X 88.9) is a New Jersey college radio station with an Alternative Rock format.  The studios and production facilities are located at Monmouth University in West Long Branch, New Jersey.

History 
WMCX began broadcasting on 88.1 MHz from Monmouth University on May 2, 1974.  At 10 watts, the station could only be heard within a radius of 2–3 miles.  In September 17, 1987, the station moved to 88.9 MHz and increased power to 1,000 watts.  Today, the station has a broadcast radius of approximately 15 miles in various towns located in Monmouth and Ocean counties in New Jersey. The station has more than 500,000 listeners both domestically and internationally thanks largely to the "listen live" streaming radio feature on their official web site. This feature enables listeners to tune into the station from anywhere in the world at any time. In addition to playing college rock, WMCX is also home to a news department and the only home of Monmouth Football, Basketball, and Baseball games on the radio.

WMCX went on the air on May 2, 1974 as 88.1 FM, a 10 watt station.  On March 29, 1984: A fire destroyed the station and remained off the air for nearly a year until reopening on  March 6, 1985.  On June 26, 1986 the station applied to the FCC for a new frequency and power. That approval came on September 17, 1987 for a 1000 watt station, broadcasting at 88.9 MHz.

The station launched streaming audio from its website on November 13, 1999.  In the Fall of 2002 the station relocated to the Jules L. Plangere Jr. Center for Communication and Instructional Technology on campus.

On September 3, 2017, WMCX changed its slogan from "Throwbacks When You Want It, New Music When You Need It" to "Rockin' the Shore Since '74."

See also
 Monmouth University

External links

Modern rock radio stations in the United States
MCX
Radio stations established in 1974
Monmouth University
West Long Branch, New Jersey